Roland Brown is an English barrister who served as the first Attorney General of Tanzania.

Early life and career
Brown was a part time lecturer at Trinity College at the University of Cambridge. He was appointed as a constitutional adviser to Julius Nyerere, the leader of the Tanganyika Territory's independence movement.

Tanzania
In 1961, he was appointed as the first Attorney General of independent Tanganyika, succeeding J. S. R. Cole. However, he was not a member of the cabinet. After the revolution that overthrew the neighbouring Sultanate of Zanzibar in 1964, Nyerere is said to have asked him to draft a union agreement in the strictest confidence between Tanganyika and the new state of the People's Republic of Zanzibar and Pemba. In 1965, he was succeeded by Mark Bomani.

Following the 1967 Arusha Declaration, Brown was given three days to prepare a bill for the nationalization of private owned banks in the country.

References

External links
 Conceiving the Tanganyika-Zanzibar Union in the Midst of the Cold War: Internal and International Factors (PDF)

English barristers
Attorneys General of Tanzania
Tanganyikan politicians